Acacia blayana, commonly known as Blay's wattle or Brogo wattle, is a tree of the genus Acacia that is native to south eastern Australia.

Description
The terete branchlets angle upward and are green, brown or purplish in colour. The leaf and petiole are usually  in length and is sparsely haired to glabrous. The pinnae occur in pair of two to four with a length . The inflorescences occur in panicles with globose heads with a diameter of  containing 12 to 30 bright yellow flowers. Flowering occurs in spring between September and October.

Taxonomy
The species was first formally described by the botanists Mary Tindale and Arthur Bertram Court in 1990 as part of the work Acacia blayana, a new species from the South Coast of New South Wales (Acacia sect. Botrycephalae: Fabaceae) as published in the journal Telopea. It was later reclassified as Racosperma blayanum by Leslie Pedley in 2003 then returned to the genus Acacia in 2006.
The type specimen was collected by John Blay in 1982 in the Brogo River catchment to the west of Cobargo. The species is named for the author and collector John Blay.

Distribution
A. blayana is found only on the eastern side of the Great Dividing Range at Wadbilliga National Park in steep mountainous country. The habitat is shallow rocky soils with relatively tall eucalyptus trees nearby. It is a rare plant with a ROTAP rating of 2RC-. It occurs in pure stands and is sometimes associated with Acacia mearnsii or with species of Eucalyptus and Tristaniopsis laurina.

See also
 List of Acacia species

References 

blayana
Fabales of Australia
Flora of New South Wales
Trees of Australia
Plants described in 1990
Taxa named by Mary Douglas Tindale